The Economists’ Statement on Carbon Dividends is a joint statement signed by over 3,500 U.S. economists promoting a carbon dividends framework for U.S. climate policy. The statement was organized by the Climate Leadership Council and originally published on January 16, 2019 in The Wall Street Journal with signatures from 45 Nobel Prize winning economists, former chairs of the Federal Reserve, former chairs of the CEA, and former secretaries of the Treasury Department.

Since its original publication, the statement has been signed by over 3,500 U.S. economists and has been recognized as the largest statement in the history of the economics profession.

Summary 
The statement recognizes an immediate need for climate action and offers five policy recommendations:

 A carbon tax is the most cost-effective method of reducing carbon emissions at the necessary scale and speed.
 The carbon tax should be revenue neutral and designed to increase every year until emissions reductions goals are met.
 A sufficiently robust carbon tax can replace carbon regulations that are less efficient.
 A border carbon adjustment system will prevent carbon leakage and enhance the competitiveness of American firms that are more energy-efficient that their foreign competitors.
 The carbon tax's revenue should be distributed to U.S. citizens in equal lump-sum payments.

Reception 
The statement was praised for the spectrum of economic thought and political opinion represented by its signatories. Former Harvard University President and U.S. Treasury Secretary Larry Summers called the statement’s proposal “one of the few ideas of economic policy that commands broad, bipartisan support.” The Chicago Booth Review noted that it was “perhaps the closest that the economics profession has ever come to a consensus.” Former chair of the Federal Reserve and the CEA Janet Yellen praised the statement for its broader political implications, saying it “represents a major tipping point in U.S. climate policy.”

Original Signatories 
The original 45 signers of the statement were:
 George Akerlof
 Robert Aumann
 Martin Baily
 Ben Bernanke
 Michael Boskin
 Angus Deaton
 Peter Diamond
 Robert Engle
 Eugene Fama
 Martin Feldstein
 Jason Furman
 Austan Goolsbee
 Alan Greenspan
 Lars Hansen
 Oliver Hart
 Bengt Holmström
 Glenn Hubbard
 Daniel Kahneman
 Alan Krueger
 Finn Kydland
 Edward Lazear
 Robert Lucas
 N. Gregory Mankiw
 Eric Maskin
 Daniel McFadden
 Robert Merton
 Roger Myerson
 Edmund Phelps
 Christina Romer
 Harvey Rosen
 Alvin Roth
 Thomas Sargent
 Myron Scholes
 Amartya Sen
 William Sharpe
 Robert Shiller
 George Shultz
 Christopher Sims
 Robert Solow
 Michael Spence
 Lawrence Summers
 Richard Thaler
 Laura Tyson
 Paul Volcker
 Janet Yellen

References 

Economics and climate change